Mario Caccia (born 22 June 1920) is an Italian retired professional football player.

1920 births
Possibly living people
People from Busto Arsizio
Italian footballers
Serie A players
Aurora Pro Patria 1919 players
Pisa S.C. players
U.S. Lecce players
Inter Milan players
Association football forwards
Sportspeople from the Province of Varese
Footballers from Lombardy